Cyber may refer to:

Computing and the Internet
 Cyber-, from cybernetics, a transdisciplinary approach for exploring regulatory and purposive systems

Crime and security
 Cyber crime, crime that involves computers and networks
 Convention on Cybercrime, the first international treaty seeking to address Internet and computer crime, signed in 2001
 Cybercrime countermeasures
 Cyber-attack, an offensive manoeuvre that targets computing devices, information systems, infrastructures and Cyberinfrastructures, or networks
 Cybersecurity, or computer security
 Cybersex trafficking, the live streaming of coerced sexual acts and or rape
 Cyberterrorism, use of the Internet to carry out terrorism   
 Cyberwarfare, the targeting of computers and networks in war

Other uses in computing and the Internet
 CDC Cyber, a range of mainframe computers
 Cyberbullying, bullying or harassment using electronic means
 Cybercafé or Internet café, a business which provides internet access
 Cyberculture, emergent cultures based on the use of computer networks
 Cybergoth sub-culture
 Cybersex (colloquially)
 Cyberstalking, use of the Internet or other electronic means to stalk or harass an individual, group, or organization
 Cyberspace, the global technology environment

Arts, entertainment, and media
 CY8ER, a five-person EDM idol group
 Cyber (Marvel Comics), a Marvel comics supervillain
 Cyber (Russian: Кибер), a Soviet sci-fi character (see Strugatsky's works)
 Doctor Cyber, a DC Comics supervillain
 Cyberpunk, a science fiction genre

See also 

 
 
 Centre for Integrative Bee Research (CIBER)
 Cybernetics (disambiguation)
 Cybernetic organism, or cyborg, a being with both organic and biomechatronic body parts
 Cyberneticist, one who studies cybernetics
 Cyber City (disambiguation)
 Cyberspace (disambiguation)
 Cyborg (disambiguation)